Ellery Queen and the Perfect Crime is a 1941 American mystery film directed by James P. Hogan and written by Eric Taylor. The film was loosely based on the 1938 novel The Devil to Pay by Ellery Queen. It stars Ralph Bellamy, Margaret Lindsay, Charley Grapewin, Spring Byington, H. B. Warner and James Burke. The film was released on August 14, 1941, by Columbia Pictures.

Plot

Cast          
Ralph Bellamy as Ellery Queen
Margaret Lindsay as Nikki Porter
Charley Grapewin as Inspector Queen
Spring Byington as Carlotta Emerson
H. B. Warner as Ray Jardin
James Burke as Sgt. Velie
Douglass Dumbrille as John Matthews
John Beal as Walter Matthews
Linda Hayes as Marian Jardin
Sidney Blackmer as Anthony Rhodes
Walter Kingsford as Henry
Honorable Wu as Lee
Charles Lane as Dr. Prouty
Charles Halton as Rufus Smith
Arthur Q. Bryan as Book Salesman

References

External links
 

1941 films
1940s English-language films
American mystery films
1941 mystery films
Columbia Pictures films
Films directed by James Patrick Hogan
American black-and-white films
1940s American films
Ellery Queen films